George Suri (born 16 July 1982 in Honiara) is a Solomon Islands soccer defender, currently playing for NZFC (New Zealand Football Championship) side Auckland City FC.

Club career
Nicknamed Jungle, he has previously played for East Coast Bays and Waitakere United in New Zealand.

International career
Suri made his debut for the Solomon Islands national football team in 2002 against New Zealand and has collected 19 caps, scoring 1 goal.

Career statistics

International goals

External links

 Profile - New Zealand Football Championship
 Profile - Auckland City FC
 2008/2009 stats - NZFC

1982 births
Living people
People from Honiara
Solomon Islands footballers
Solomon Islands international footballers
East Coast Bays AFC players
Waitakere United players
Auckland City FC players
2002 OFC Nations Cup players
2004 OFC Nations Cup players
New Zealand Football Championship players
Expatriate association footballers in New Zealand
Solomon Islands expatriate sportspeople in New Zealand
Association football defenders